Jean-Charles, marquis de Castelbajac (born 28 November 1949), also known as JC/DC, is a Moroccan/French fashion designer. He has enjoyed international success with some of his creations, including a coat of teddy bears worn by pop star Madonna  and by supermodel Helena Christensen in the film Prêt-à-Porter and a sequin jacket for Beyonce, and a Donald Duck costume for Rihanna. During his career he has befriended and worked with artists such as Andy Warhol, Keith Haring, Jean Michel Basquiat, Malcolm McLaren, Robert Mapplethorpe, M.I.A, Cassette Playa, Curry & Coco, The Coconut Twins and Lady Gaga.

His fashion archive was showcased in preparation for his retrospective "Gallie Rock" in Paris by photographers Tim and Barry, modelled by Cassette Playa, M.I.A., Jammer, Matthew Stone, Slew Dem Crew, and more.

His creations have been displayed at New York's Institute of Fashion and Technology, London's Victoria&Albert Museum and the Galliera Museum in Paris. In 2015, he created a 3,700 m2 "Mural for Orly Airport in Paris" .

As well as his imaginative clothing collections, the designer creates home furnishings  and has designed a watch inspired by the childhood favourite, Lego. He also has collaborated with Swatch, Weston, Ligne Roset, Petit Bateau, Citroën, Tecnica, Kway, Coca-Cola, Vilebrequin, Aigle and Palace skateboards.

All the artistic environments he touches on have his signature rainbow chromatic range in common. One of the best examples of this is the line he created for Pope John Paul II, 500 bishops and 5,000 priests for the 1997 World Youth Day in Paris.

As Keith Haring initiated him to street-art, Jean-Charles de Castelbajac uses chalk to leave his poetic mark on the walls of the world's capitals.

His career as a fashion designer started in 1968 alongside his mother, when he created Ko & Co. The first "manifesto"  piece of clothing he produced was a coat he made, using the blanket he used when he was at boarding school. He founded maison Jean-Charles de Castelbajac in 1978, which he left in 2016.

Between the 1970s and the 1990s, de Castelbajac was also the artistic director of fashion houses including Max Mara and Courrèges and he co-founded Iceberg in 1974. In 1979, in consonance with pop art, he designed cartoon pullovers that have since become iconic.

In 2005, Raika was the de Castelbajac ready-to-wear license holder in Japan with retail value of €20 million.
He also attended King of kitsch at Paris Fashion Week in 2010.

In 2017, he collaborated with smartphone maker OnePlus to release a collection called the "Callection" that was centred around a limited edition OnePlus 5 smartphone.

In 2018, he was named artistic director for the Benetton Group.

In 2019, he collaborated with Palace Skateboards to release a collection featuring clothing, hats, and playing cards.

References

External links
 , de Castelbajac's official website

1949 births
20th-century French male artists
21st-century French male artists
Chevaliers of the Légion d'honneur
Commandeurs of the Ordre des Arts et des Lettres
French artistic directors
French company founders
French fashion designers
French marquesses
French women fashion designers
Knights of the Ordre national du Mérite
Living people
 Menswear designers
People from Casablanca